Guinea competed at the 2016 Summer Olympics in Rio de Janeiro, Brazil, from 5 to 21 August 2016. This was the nation's eleventh appearance at the Summer Olympics since its debut in 1968. Guinea failed to register any athletes at the 1972 Summer Olympics in Munich, and eventually joined the rest of the African nations to boycott the 1976 Summer Olympics in Montreal.

Five Guinean athletes, two men and three women, were selected to the team, competing only in athletics, judo, and swimming; all of them received their spots through wild card entries. Half-middleweight judoka Mamadama Bangoura led the Guinean squad as the nation's flag bearer in the opening ceremony. Guinea, however, has yet to win its first ever Olympic medal.

Athletics

Guinea has received universality slots from IAAF to send two athletes (one male and one female) to the Olympics.

Track & road events

Judo
 
Guinea has received an invitation from the Tripartite Commission to send a judoka competing in the women's half-middleweight category (63 kg) to the Olympics.

Swimming

Guinea has received a Universality invitation from FINA to send two swimmers (one male and one female) to the Olympics.

References

External links
 
 

Nations at the 2016 Summer Olympics
2016
Olympics